Stanley Albert Tolliday (6 August 1922 – 26 June 1951) was an English professional footballer who played as a goalkeeper in the Football League for Leyton Orient and Walsall.

References

1922 births
1951 deaths
Footballers from Hackney, London
English footballers
Association football goalkeepers
Leyton Orient F.C. players
Walsall F.C. players
English Football League players